, provisional designation , is a sub-kilometer sized, peanut-shaped asteroid on a highly eccentric orbit, classified as near-Earth object and potentially hazardous asteroid of the Apollo group. This contact binary was discovered on 23 February 2006, by astronomers of the LINEAR program at the Lincoln Laboratory's Experimental Test Site near Socorro, New Mexico, in the United States. On 10 February 2014, it passed 6.25 lunar distances from Earth. The asteroid is approximately 400 meters in diameter and has a rotation period of 5.77 hours.

Classification and orbit 

 is a member of the Apollo group, which are Earth-crossing asteroids and the largest group of near-Earth asteroids.

It orbits the Sun at a distance of 0.3–2.4 AU once every 19 months (583 days; semi-major axis of 1.37 AU). Its orbit has a high eccentricity of 0.78 and an inclination of 12° with respect to the ecliptic. As no precoveries were taken, the body's observation arc begins with its discovery observation in 2006.

Close approaches 

This makes is a potentially hazardous asteroid (PHA), a body with a threatening close approach to the Earth, due to its low MOID and large size (absolute magnitude of 18.9). PHAs are defined as objects with an absolute magnitude of 22 or brighter – which generically corresponds to a diameter of approximately 140 meters – and a MOID that is smaller than 0.05 AU or 19.5 LD.

Physical characteristics 

 is an assumed stony S-type asteroid. This asteroid is a typical contact binary, with two distinctive lobes on either end that appear to be in contact, giving it a peanut-like shape.

Diameter, shape and albedo 

On the night of 11 February 2014, NASA scientists conducted a radar imaging session using the 70-meter dish at Goldstone Observatory. These observations, using delay-Doppler radar imaging, revealed a 400×200 meters sized body, while the Collaborative Asteroid Lightcurve Link calculates a diameter of almost 500 meters, based on an assumed standard albedo for stony asteroids of 0.20 and an absolute magnitude of 18.9.

Amateur and professional astronomers helped track  in the preceding days, so they would know just where to point the large antenna.

Rotation period 

Goldstone's radiometric observations also gave a rotation period of approximately 6 hours. Photometric follow-up observations led to two light-curves that gave a refined period of 5.77 and 5.78 hours with a high brightness variation of 1.05 and 0.9, respectively. Its high brightness amplitude is also indicative for its elongated shape.

Naming 

As of 2018, this minor planet remains unnamed.

Notes

References

External links 
 Asteroid Lightcurve Database (LCDB), query form (info )
 Asteroids and comets rotation curves, CdR – Observatoire de Genève, Raoul Behrend
 
 
 

388188
388188
388188
388188
388188
20140210
20060223